Asiopsocus is a genus of barklice, booklice, and parasitic lice in the family Asiopsocidae. There are about seven described species in Asiopsocus.

Species
These seven species belong to the genus Asiopsocus:
 Asiopsocus meridionalis Lienhard, 1981
 Asiopsocus mongolicus Günther, 1968
 Asiopsocus sonorensis Mockford & Garcia Aldrete, 1976
 Asiopsocus spinosus Mockford, 2005
 Asiopsocus tehuacanus Garcia Aldrete & Casasola, 1995
 Asiopsocus vanharteni Lienhard, 1995
 Asiopsocus wulingshanensis Li, 2002

References

Caeciliusetae
Articles created by Qbugbot